The 2020 Georgia Public Service Commission election was held on November 3, 2020, to elect two members to the Georgia Public Service Commission, concurrently with the presidential election as well as both a regular and special election to the U.S. Senate and elections to the United States House of Representatives and various state and local elections. While Republican incumbent appointee Jason Shaw defeated Democrat Robert Bryant for District 1, Republican incumbent Lauren "Bubba" McDonald was forced to a runoff against Democrat Daniel Blackman for District 4. While the runoff was initially scheduled for December 3, it was moved by Secretary of State Brad Raffensperger to the January 5, 2021 runoff, alongside the runoff elections for both Senate seats.

This is the sixth runoff election held for a Public Service Commission seat since runoffs were first mandated by law in 1964, with the first runoff being held in 1992 alongside a U.S. Senate runoff and successive PSC runoffs having been held in 1998, 2006, 2008, and 2018. Were he to win, Blackman would become only the second African American member on the Commission in its history, with Democrat David Burgess having served from 1999 until his defeat in a 2006 runoff by Republican Chuck Eaton; Burgess was also the last Democrat to serve on the commission, with McDonald having changed his party affiliation after first being elected. Blackman and McDonald previously ran against each other for District 4 in 2014.

Allegations of improper ballots 
Bubba McDonald, the Republican incumbent in the race, won the January 5th runoff by 33,727 votes over Democratic challenger Daniel Blackman.  The down-ballot race was an anomaly, due to Commissioner McDonald receiving more total votes than any other Republican on the runoff ballot. Republican Incumbents David Perdue and Kelly Loeffler both lost their respective races to Democratic challengers Raphael Warnock and Jon Ossoff.  After the runoff election, Daniel Blackman alleged the race may have been missing from some ballots, after receiving reports from voters.  While "Blackman trailed Republican incumbent Lauren “Bubba” McDonald by over 33,000 votes, or 0.74 percentage points, outside the margin where he'd be entitled to a recount," the Georgia Secretary of State opened an investigation into the matter.

After the investigation, as stated in the Atlanta Journal-Constitution, "Georgia election officials say they found no evidence that the Public Service Commission race was left off some ballots, and Democrat Daniel Blackman acknowledged Wednesday that he had lost to Republican Lauren “Bubba” McDonald."  Walter Jones, the spokesman for the Georgia Secretary of State's office stated, “We have learned from 2018 to now — from Stacey Abrams to Donald Trump — that false claims and disinformation that an election has been stolen is dangerous to our democracy” In the same AJC article, it was mentioned that "Blackman never alleged the PSC election was stolen, saying he wanted to make sure that every vote was counted."

References

Georgia Public Service Commission
Public Service Commission
Georgia (U.S. state) state constitutional officer elections